The Polytechnic, Ibadan (typically called "Poly Ibadan") is an institution of higher learning in Ibadan in Oyo State, Nigeria. Founded in 1970, Poly Ibadan is similar to other polytechnics in Nigeria. The institution was established to provide an alternative higher education to universities, particularly in technical skill acquisition. The vocational and skills acquisition centre is poised to ensure that students master a skill before leaving the institution and also provides skills training to the host community. Poly Ibadan is also well known for its unique slogan written in Yoruba language as "Ise loogun ise" which means 'Work is the medicine for poverty', a classical Yoruba adage  which stresses that hard work is the way out of poverty.

Curriculum 
The institution offers a wide range of specialized short courses for the purpose of improving the vocational capabilities of technical and commercial workers. Poly Ibadan awards Ordinary National Diploma (OND), Higher National Diploma (HND), Post Graduate Diploma ( PGD) and other professional certificates to its graduates. It also provides opportunities for creative development and research related to the needs of teaching, industry and the business community.

Academic Programmes 

The polytechnic runs mainly National Diploma (ND) and Higher National Diploma (HND) programmes in the following on full-time, part-time or sandwich basis.

Faculties and their Departments 

Faculty of Engineering
 Civil Engineering
 Electrical Engineering
 Mechanical Engineering
 Computer Engineering
 Mechatronics
Faculty of Science
 Science Laboratory Technology
 Biology and Microbiology
 Applied Chemistry
 Biochemistry
 Physics with Electronics
 Geology
 Computer Science
 Statistics
Faculty of Environmental Studies
 Architecture
 Urban and Regional Planning
 Estate Management
 Quantity Surveying
 Building Technology
 Painting and Sculpture
 Industrial Design
 Graphics & Printing
 Land Surveying and Geoinformatics
Faculty of Financial Management Science
 Accountancy
 Banking and Finance
 Insurance
Faculty of Business and Communication Science
 Mass Communication
 Marketing
 Business Administration
 Office Technology Management
 Purchasing and Supply
 Local Government Studies
 Public Administration

Notable alumni 

 Dapo Lam Adesina, Member of House of Representative for Ibadan North East/South Federal Constituency
 Rauf Aregbesola, Nigerian politician, former governor of Osun State and current Minister of interior.
 Adebiyi Daramola, Nigerian academic and former vice chancellor of the Federal University of Technology Akure.
 Adeyeye Enitan Ogunwusi. Traditional monarch of Ilé-Ifè, Osun State, Nigeria
 Oluwole Omofemi. Nigerian painter, known for painting the last commissioned painting of Queen Elizabeth II before her demise.

Gallery

References 

 
Polytechnics in Nigeria
1970 establishments in Nigeria
Educational institutions established in 1970
Universities and colleges in Ibadan